Paraselotis is a genus of moth in the family Gelechiidae. It contains only one species, Paraselotis pelochroa, which is found in South Africa.

References

Endemic moths of South Africa
Chelariini